Michael Gligic (born September 19, 1989) is a Canadian professional golfer on the PGA Tour. He secured his PGA Tour membership by finishing 17th on the 2019 Korn Ferry Tour regular-season points list.

Professional career
Gligic turned professional in 2008 and obtained full status on the Canadian Tour in 2009. He achieved his first professional victory in 2012 at the ATB Financial Classic, where he beat Matt Marshall in a playoff.

In 2018, Gligic was named the Freedom 55 Financial Canadian Player of the Year. He finished the year 16th on the PGA Tour Canada Order of Merit.

Gligic earned status on the Korn Ferry Tour for 2019 and claimed his first victory in February at the Panama Championship. A final-round 65 saw him finish one better than Zhang Xinjun. He finished 17th on the 2019 Korn Ferry Tour Regular Season points list, securing his playing rights on the PGA Tour for the first time in his career.

Professional wins (2)

Korn Ferry Tour wins (1)

Canadian Tour wins (1)

Team appearances
Professional
Aruba Cup (representing PGA Tour Canada): 2016

See also
2019 Korn Ferry Tour Finals graduates
2021 Korn Ferry Tour Finals graduates
2022 Korn Ferry Tour Finals graduates

References

External links

Canadian male golfers
PGA Tour golfers
Korn Ferry Tour graduates
Sportspeople from Burlington, Ontario
Sportspeople from Kitchener, Ontario
1989 births
Living people